The French Polynesia national junior handball team is the national men's junior handball team of French Polynesia. They won the Oceania Handball Challenge Trophy in Wellington at their first attempt.

Oceania Handball Challenge Trophy

IHF Inter-Continental Trophy

References

External links
 Profile on International Handball Federation webpage
 Oceania Continent Handball Federation webpage

Men's national junior handball teams
H